Gelastocoris is a genus of toad bugs in the family Gelastocoridae. There are more than 20 described species in Gelastocoris.

Species
These 23 species belong to the genus Gelastocoris:

 Gelastocoris amazonensis Melin, 1929
 Gelastocoris andinus Melin, 1929
 Gelastocoris apureensis Melin, 1929
 Gelastocoris barberi Torre-Bueno
 Gelastocoris bolivianus De Carlo, 1954
 Gelastocoris bufo (Herrich-Schäffer, 1840)
 Gelastocoris curiosus Poinar & Brown, 2016
 Gelastocoris decarloi Estévez & Schnack, 1977
 Gelastocoris flavus (Guérin-Méneville, 1835)
 Gelastocoris fuscus Martin, 1929
 Gelastocoris hungerfordi Melin, 1929
 Gelastocoris major Montandon, 1910
 Gelastocoris martinezi De Carlo, 1954
 Gelastocoris monrosi De Carlo, 1959
 Gelastocoris nebulosus (Guérin-Méneville, 1844)
 Gelastocoris oculatus (Fabricius, 1798) (big-eyed toad bug)
 Gelastocoris paraguayensis De Carlo, 1954
 Gelastocoris peruensis Melin, 1929
 Gelastocoris quadrimaculatus (Guérin-Méneville, 1844)
 Gelastocoris rotundatus Champion, 1901
 Gelastocoris vandamepompanoni Boulard & Jauffret, 1984
 Gelastocoris vicinus Champion, 1901
 Gelastocoris viridis Todd, 1955

Extinct species 

 †Gelastocoris curiosus Poinar and Brown 2016 Burmese amber, Myanmar, Cenomanian

References

Further reading

External links

 

Articles created by Qbugbot
Nepomorpha genera
Gelastocoridae